The telluride iodides are chemical compounds that contain both telluride ions (Te2−) and iodide ions (I−). They are in the class of mixed anion compounds or chalcogenide halides.

Tellurium does not normally bond with iodine, but can form many different units with bonds to other tellurium atoms.

List

References

Tellurides
Iodides